Neville is a village in the Canadian province of Saskatchewan within the Rural Municipality of Whiska Creek No. 106 and Census Division No. 3. It is located on Highway 43.

History 
Neville incorporated as a village on July 5, 1912.

Demographics 

See also 

 List of communities in Saskatchewan
 Villages of Saskatchewan

References

Villages in Saskatchewan
Whiska Creek No. 106, Saskatchewan
Division No. 3, Saskatchewan